Niederhofstraße  is a station on  of the Vienna U-Bahn. It is located in the Meidling District. It opened in 1989.

References

Buildings and structures in Meidling
Railway stations opened in 1989
Vienna U-Bahn stations